William Ford Bull (February 2, 1876 – December 17, 1941) was an American football player and coach and international Christian missionary. He credited with starting intercollegiate athletics at Hampden–Sydney College in Hampden Sydney, Virginia and initiating the school's first football team. He led the Hampden–Sydney squad as a player in 1892 and 1893 and as a player-coach in 1894. After graduating, he became a Christian missionary in Korea for the Southern Presbyterian Church, where he is credited with "leading thousands to Christ."

References

External links
 

1876 births
1941 deaths
19th-century players of American football
American Presbyterian missionaries
Hampden–Sydney Tigers football coaches
Hampden–Sydney Tigers football players